Belkaya can refer to:

 Belkaya Dam
 Belkaya, Tefenni